Hoopa (formerly Hupa, Ho-pah, Hoo-pah, Hupo, and Up-pa) is an unincorporated community and census-designated place (CDP) in Humboldt County, California. The ZIP Code is 95546.

Hoopa is a rural town located entirely on the federally-designated reservation of the Hupa and serves as the administrative capital of the Hoopa Valley Indian Reservation. Hoopa is on the Trinity River. Hoopa is in area code 530.

The Hoopa Valley post office opened in 1861; the name was changed to Hoopa in 1895, to Hupa in 1900, and back to Hoopa in 1902.

Climate
The climate is similar to that of nearby Willow Creek.

Demographics

The 2000 U.S. census recorded 3,040 people in Hoopa, and the 2010 census recorded 3,393 people. These figures therefore include people living in Hoopa Valley outside the town of Hoopa.  The ethnic composure of the area was 14.1% White, 0.1% Black or African American, 81.7% Native American, 0.3% Asian, 0.8% from other races, and 2.9% from two or more races. 4.5% of the population were Hispanic or Latino of any race.

Politics

In the Hoopa Valley Tribal Council, Hoopa is represented in six of seven council districts.

See also

References

Census-designated places in Humboldt County, California
Native American populated places
Census-designated places in California
1861 establishments in California
Populated places established in 1861